Peter Griffin (17 December 1939 – 17 January 2007) was a German disco musician.

Biography
Peter Kamp was born on the 17th of December.
He was the owner of a German discotheque called Griffin's, in the city of Baden-Baden.

His first release was the 7" single "I Hate the Music" in 1977, followed by "I'm in the Race" in 1978.
In 1979, he released "Spiderman" as his third single. Shortly thereafter, the 12" version was released and the song became a major club hit that year.

He had two other club hits between 1980 and 1981. The songs were "Step By Step", which was originally released on Electrola of Germany. The song gained popularity as an import, and the fledgling Moby Dick Records picked it up for U.S. release, issuing a remixed version. The following year Electrola issued "Inside Out", another up-tempo number. No American company opted to license it, yet it still received good club exposure.
After his music career, he was very successful with several restaurants in Baden-Baden, Achern, Prague, and San Diego.

He is the father of actress/model Alexandra Kamp, born 1966.

Peter Griffin died on 17 January 2007 in Baden-Baden, Germany at the age of 67.

External links
 
 Discography

Eurodisco musicians
1939 births
2007 deaths
20th-century German male musicians
20th-century German musicians